Little Toms Run is a stream in the U.S. state of West Virginia.

Little Toms Run most likely was named after Thomas Smith, Sr., a local landowner.

See also
List of rivers of West Virginia

References

Rivers of Marshall County, West Virginia
Rivers of West Virginia